Fahlan Sakkreerin or Fahlan Lukmingkwan (born 10 April 1968) is a retired Thai professional boxer who takes  IBF mini flyweight and WBF flyweight world championships in 1990s.

Boxing career
Fahlan made his debut by defeating to future two-times WBA minimumweight titleholder Chana Porpaoin in June 1988. He boxes under "Lukmingkwan Boxing Gym" (ค่ายมวยลูกมิ่งขวัญ), located at Mingkwan Alley, Nonthaburi by Manoch Buabut as a trainer and manager. He used the name "Fahlan Lukmingkwan".

He had 13 consecutive wins, including the Rajadamnern Stadium mini flyweight championship. He was sponsored by Sr. Col. Banju Ongsangkune for challenge to IBF in same weight world title with Eric Chávez, a Filipino boxer on February 22, 1990 at Rajadamnern Stadium. The result was that he was the winner by TKO in the seventh round, because Chávez had an eyebrow wound and couldn't continue to fight. But in this bout he has been criticized about headbutted.

He defended his title seven times in all Thailand. Later, Manoch Buabut had a conflict of interest with Banju Ongsangkune, who had become Fahlan's co-manager. The result of the eighth defense against Manny Melchor at Samutprakarn Crocodile Farm and Zoo, Samutprakarn in 1992 to him to lose in order to change the new boxer to challenge world title comeback. (in the future, the new boxer is Ratanapol Sor Vorapin).

Fahlan continued to fight for two years and switching to a new team and the new manager, Ekarat "Jimmy" Chaichotchuang of Kiat Kreerin Promotion, by Pol. Lt. Col. Kreerin Inkaew as sponsor. He started using the new name "Fahlan Sakkreerin". He was encouraged to promoted to flyweight and challenge WBF world champion with Bulgarian boxer, Krasimir Cholakov at Southern Association of Thailand located in suburban Bangkok on October 22, 1994. As a result,  he wins by unanimous decision.

This time, he defended his title eight times before being stripped in November 2000. Later he also won the IBF Pan Pacific light flyweight title and was able to defend  five times between 2002 and 2007. He also had the opportunity to challenge the world title of the major organizations WBO and IBF in the minimumweight and light flyweight four times, but not successful and every bout takes place abroad.

His boxing style is fighter. Currently, Fahlan has a son who's a boxer like him, is a Fahlan Sakkreerin Jr. or Teeraphong Utaida.

See also
List of minimumweight boxing champions
List of IBF world champions

References

External links
 

Living people
1968 births
Mini-flyweight boxers
Flyweight boxers
Light-flyweight boxers
Fahlan Sakkreerin
Fahlan Sakkreerin
International Boxing Federation champions